The 2017 Fórmula Truck season was the 22nd Fórmula Truck season. In 2017, several teams left the organization to create a new championship called Copa Truck. After 2 rounds of the 2017 season, the lack of audience, partners and drives forced the postponement of the 3rd race twice. After that, the organization website announced that the 2017 season was cancelled and that they would try to return in 2018.

Teams and drivers
All drivers were Brazilian-registered, excepting Carolina Cánepa, Fabricio Larratea and Gabriel Cato, who raced under Uruguayan racing license, and Alan Chanoski, who raced under Paraguayan racing license.

References

External links
  

2017 in Brazilian motorsport
2017